Turon National Park is located along a section of the Turon River in central New South Wales, Australia. Proposed as an area worth protecting in 1983, the park was not established until 2002.

Turon National Park was one of the sites of the 1851 gold rush, and remains from this era are still evident. Pasture land cleared in the past remain obvious. Sheoak grows along the river and a variety of gums cover the slopes. A large variety of native birds live within the park, and red wallabies spend the day on the sandstone tops and descend at dusk to the valley. Sub-zero temperatures are common in the cooler months.

Access to the valley floor is difficult for 2-wheel-drive vehicles, and after heavy rainfall even four-wheel-drive access is doubtful.

Two campsites are identified on Wikimapia.

Many interesting animals live here, such as the mighty owl howling at night or the red wallabies sunbathing on the red sandstone in the morning.

References

External links
NSW National Parks and Wildlife Service: information about Turon National Park

See also
 Sofala, New South Wales

National parks of New South Wales
Protected areas established in 2002
2002 establishments in Australia